Asterode is a municipal district of the town of Neukirchen in Schwalm-Eder-Kreis district in Hesse, Germany.

References

Villages in Hesse